Chris Di Staulo (born November 9, 1990) is a Canadian film director. His films include those with elements of comedy, magic realism, dreams and psychological drama. His works have been selected for the Cannes International Film Festival, Canada International Film Festival, Las Vegas Film Festival and National Screen Institute. Di Staulo's films have been acquired and broadcast globally by networks CBC Television and ShortsTV.

Early life and education 
Christian Alexander Di Staulo was born in Toronto, Ontario to Joseph and Susan Di Staulo (née Blackwell), and has one sister. In his teen years, he was a drama major at Etobicoke School of the Arts, one of the top arts high schools in Canada. Di Staulo attended York University and received a Bachelor of Arts (Specialized Honours) in Directing.

Di Staulo completed a Bachelor of Education at the University of Windsor. He is certified to teach Drama and English in Ontario.

Somnolence 
In 2013, Di Staulo directed the short psychological drama Somnolence; George Porter lives in a world where humans have evolved beyond sleep and as a result no longer dream, but he is somehow haunted by dreams of his sister. Di Staulo was one of only a few Canadians selected to showcase their work at the Cannes International Film Festival in 2014. CBC commented on how the Canadian representation at Cannes in 2014 was “an incredible vindication of our film culture.” Somnolence won Best Cinematography and Best Special Effects in a Short Film at the Hollywood & Vine Film Festival in Los Angeles; Award of Excellence at the Best Shorts Competition in San Diego, Accolade Global Film Competition, and IndieFEST Film Awards; a Gold Award at the Aurora Awards; and a nomination for Best Original Score (scored by Nicolas Techer) at both the Hollywood Music in the Media Festival and the Utah Music Awards.

Dirty Talk 
Di Staulo has created a variety of short films, including his most popular short, Dirty Talk. The film starred Jeremy Ferdman and Katie Strain. On February 14, 2015, Dirty Talk aired on CBC to celebrate the success of Canadian filmmakers for the program Canadian Reflections on CBC Television. This film has amassed over 100,000 views on YouTube.

Created as part of the Toronto Film Challenge, where filmmakers were challenged to create a short film in 24 hours using a provided theme, prop, line and location, Dirty Talk cleaned house, taking home awards for Best Picture, Best Actor, Best Actress, Best Cinematography, and Best Sound. This film also received an Award of Excellence from the Canada Film Festival and was an official selection for the Las Vegas Film Festival in 2014.

Other work 
Di Staulo has directed a number of other short films, including his most recent O(A)R, a documentary about Moby Grape frontman Skip Spence. Prior to that he filmed Love for Hire in early 2020, a dark comedy about a matchmaking service run by a middle-aged, jaded Cupid.

Filmography 
Films

Selected Music Videos

"LIKE2LIKE" - Gabriela Bee of The Bee Family (2021)

"Love You Right" - Walk off the Earth ft. Lukas Graham (2021)

"A Few Good Stories" - Brett Kissel ft. Walk off the Earth (2020)

"Words" - Brianna Corona (2019)

References

External links

Chris Di Staulo on Vimeo
Chris Di Staulo (@chrisdistaulo) on Instagram

Living people
Film directors from Toronto
1990 births